Buttonville Municipal Airport or Toronto/Buttonville Municipal Airport  is a medium-sized airport in the neighbourhood of Buttonville in Markham, Ontario, Canada,  north of Toronto. It is operated by Torontair. Due to its proximity to Toronto's suburbs, there are several strict noise-reduction procedures for aircraft using the airport, which is open and staffed 24 hours a day, 365 days a year. In 2014, Buttonville was Canada's 20th busiest airport by aircraft movements. There is also a weather station located at the airport.

The airport is classified as an airport of entry by Nav Canada and is serviced by the Canada Border Services Agency (CBSA) on a call-out basis from Oshawa Executive Airport during weekdays and Billy Bishop Toronto City Airport during weekends. CBSA officers at this airport handle general aviation aircraft only, with no more than 15 passengers.

History
Fred F. Gillies was the operator of Buttonville Airport and Gillies Flying Service starting in 1953 until he retired in 1958.
Buttonville Airport began to really grow as a grass airstrip in 1953 when Leggat Aviation moved its operations from Barker Field in Toronto. The airstrip became an official airport in 1962.

The airport is located in the community and former police village of Buttonville, Ontario, which is named for settler John Button. Part of the airport property is located on land once held by Button.

New air traffic control tower

On January 17, 2006, Nav Canada announced plans for the construction of a new air traffic control tower at Buttonville Airport. It is located at the south end of airport next to FlightExec offices on Allstate Parkway.

The new tower, representing an investment of over $2 million, replaced the existing facility, which was built in 1967 and had reached the end of its useful life. Construction began in the fall of 2006 and became fully operational on June 26, 2007. The new tower provided expanded operational space, optimal visibility and the latest in air navigation equipment and technology for 10 air traffic controllers and one support staff who provided service to 84,000 aircraft movements per year at Buttonville Airport. It is located on the south side of the airport – the opposite side of the old tower. The new tower was designed and built using a modular design enabling the facility to be relocated in the future. New equipment and technology include the Nav Canada Auxiliary Radar Display System and the company's state-of-the-art voice communications switch.

NAV Canada shut down operations of the air traffic control tower on January 3, 2019.

Future

In September 2009, the Sifton family, owners of the airport, announced plans to re-develop the airport from 2009 to 2016 into a mixed use of commercial, retail and residential development. In the meantime the airport will continue to operate and unknown plans for the airport operations to re-locate to another GTA airport or cease operations altogether.

On 28 October 2010, a press release announced that a joint real estate venture had purchased the 170-acre property on 7 October, which will be re-developed by Cadillac Fairview. Plans include condominiums, retail shops, and office space.  Due to planning delays, in 2018 Cadillac Fairview announced the site will continue to operate as an airport until at least 2023.

Buttonville Airport is privately owned, and is threatened with closure due to lack of funds. GTAA has stopped funding the airport causing a $1.5 million loss. GTAA blames the decrease of traffic at Pearson Airport for eliminating the subsidy. Transport Canada has not yet made a decision on the Pickering Airport project.

Navigation
There are three non-precision instrument approaches available: a Global Positioning System (GPS) approach to runway 33, a non-directional beacon (NDB) approach to runway 21, and a localizer approach to runway 15.

Radio
Buttonville Airport is in a Class E control zone. Aircraft must broadcast their intentions on the mandatory frequency 124.8 MHz prior to entering the control zone. Afterwards standard uncontrolled aerodrome position reports must be broadcast.

The London Flight Information Centre has a Remote Communications Outlet at the airport operating on the frequency 123.15 MHz. Toronto Terminal handles instrument flight rules (IFR) arrivals and departures and Visual Flight Rules (VFR) flight following on 133.40 MHz.

Flightline is available on 123.50 MHz.

Navigation aids
There are three ground-based navigation aids attached specifically to the Buttonville airport:

a distance measuring equipment (DME) on channel 48 (111.1 MHz) with the identifier "IKZ", located on the airfield
a localizer for runway 15 on the frequency 111.1 MHz

Airport operating restrictions

 No practice circuits outside of YKZ Control Tower hours of operation
 No practice IFR approaches outside YKZ Control Tower hours of operation
 No practice Engine Failure on Take Off procedure (EFTO) in the YKZ Positive Control Zone
 No touch and go circuits by excessively noisy aircraft

It has been agreed with the airport and the City of Markham that no circuit practice will occur between the hours of 1600h (4:00pm) and 2000h (8:00pm) during all long weekend holidays.

Tenants
 680 News Traffic Unit
 Air BP – aviation fuel supplier (100DLL and A-1)
 Air Partners Incorporated – maintenance
 Aviation Unlimited – parts and aircraft sales distributor for Piper, Diamond, Mooney and Columbia
 Buttonville Flying Club
 CFMJ-AM, 640 AM Richmond Hill
 Canadian Flyers flight training school
 CFTO-CTV News/Traffic Air Unit (C-FCTV)
 CHFI-FM, 98.1 FM Toronto Traffic Unit (shared with 680 News)
 Corus Entertainment Toronto Traffic Unit
 Druxy's Famous Deli
 High Tech Avionics and Instruments – avionics and instrument supplies
 Image Air Charter Limited
 Leggat Aviation Ltd. – an authorized Cessna dealership that specializes in new aircraft sales, full service and parts supply
 Million Air – an executive air charter
 Sugu Drone Training
 Toronto Police Service – Cessna 206H (C-FZRR)
 TruFinancial Consultants – tailor-made investment strategy, estate and financial planning services
 York Regional Police – operating base for the Air2 (C-GYRP), the force's helicopter

Seneca College's aviation campus was once at Buttonville and re-located to Peterborough Airport in 2014 after having been in Markham for over 45 years. The remaining tenants will either relocate to other airports near Toronto or cease operations.

Ground transportation

The airport is accessible to public transit via York Region Transit Route 16 (16th Avenue) which runs along the north side of the airport. It is within walking distance of the York Region Transit Route 24 stop at Woodbine Avenue and 16th Avenue. There are no direct connections with GO Transit.

Airport users can park their vehicles for free at the airport parking area on the north side. Parking lots along Renfrew Drive are reserved for airport tenants. Taxis and limousines within the Greater Toronto Area can drop off and pickup passengers.

The airport is located next to Highway 404 with connections to nearby 407, with 401 to the south and 400 to the west.

Incidents
On 25 May 2010, a Cirrus SR22 4-seater plane crashed on the roof of a building just  from the airport in Markham (Woodbine Avenue near Apple Creek Boulevard). The pilot and a passenger died in the crash; however, nobody on the ground was seriously hurt. Markham Fire and Emergency Services crews quickly doused the flames; rescue crews were not able to go on top of the building to reach the plane due to possibility of structural collapse.

On 20 June 2010, an accident occurred just off Buttonville Airport. A black four-seater banner-towing Cessna 172K Skyhawk, registration C-GQOR, crashed on Vogell Road near the intersection of Highway 404 and 16th Avenue in Richmond Hill. The pilot, the aircraft's only occupant, was killed in the crash.

On 18 November 2010, a Beech 33, tail number C-GSCZ, with a Seneca College flight instructor and two students crashed in a field in Pickering, Ontario (near Whitevale Road and North Road). All occupants died in the crash.

On 12 July 2018, a pilot was killed in a Bellanca 8KCAB when it crashed in a field near the airport (southwest area of airport in Markham).

On 27 February 2020, a Dassault Falcon 50, tail number N951DJ, was set on fire late at night. A fence was cut through and a gas can was found at the scene. The aircraft, parked outside near a hangar, was written off, damaged beyond repair. The fire is considered arson.

Support

The airport had one aircraft rescue and firefighting unit (ARFF), a Walter RIV 2000, parked against the fence along Renfrew Drive, but it was retired and no longer visible at the airport. Fire and rescue at the airfield is now provided by Markham Fire and Rescue Stations 9-2 (10 Riviera Drive near Woodbine and 14th Avenue) or 9-3 (Woodbine Avenue and Major Mackenzie Drive East).

See also
 List of airports in the Greater Toronto Area
 Markham Fire and Emergency Services

References

External links

 Toronto Buttonville Municipal Airport

Certified airports in Ontario
Airports established in 1953
Transport in the Regional Municipality of York
Buildings and structures in Markham, Ontario
1953 establishments in Ontario